Caloptilia blandella is a moth of the family Gracillariidae. It is known from Canada (Québec) the United States (including Pennsylvania, Virginia, Maine, Maryland, Texas and Kentucky).

The larvae feed on Carya ovata and Juglans nigra. They mine the leaves of their host plant. The mine has the form of a little crooked, very narrow mine resembling a small snail's track. It is found on the upperside of the leaf. Later instars create a leaf cone. It involves only one fold of the host leaflet, and therefore extensive skeletonization can be seen on the exterior of the fold. Often, the fold is located on the margin of the leaflet rather than at the apex.

References

External links
Caloptilia at microleps.org
mothphotographersgroup
Bug Guide

blandella
Moths of North America
Moths described in 1864